Ice Age: Scrat's Nutty Adventure is an action adventure game developed by Just Add Water and Climax Studios, published by Outright Games, and released on October 18, 2019 for most consoles, and later for the Google Stadia on August 13, 2021. It is based on the Ice Age franchise by 20th Century Fox and Blue Sky Studios, and was the first video game in the series to be released following Disney's acquisition of 21st Century Fox in 2019. The game focuses on Scrat, who has to complete obstacles, puzzles and beating some old foes in an attempt to retrieve The Acorn.

Story
The game follows Scrat continuing to chase the same goal as in the films, to get The Acorn. While pursuing The Acorn, he falls into a Scratazon Temple. To get The Acorn, Scrat must seek four legendary Crystal Nuts from across the world of Ice Age.

Gameplay
The game takes on the form of a 3D platformer. The player controls Scrat, with the gameplay being compared to that of 2006's Ice Age 2: The Meltdown, which allows you to jump, roll around, throw objects, and attack enemies. As the player defeats regional bosses, thus gathering the Crystal Nuts, Scrat gains new abilities such as a double jump, thus allowing the player more access over more areas of the levels. The game consists of 12 levels, split across 5 different areas (Ice Cliffs, the Ice Fields, the Ice Caves, and the Hidden World).

Development 
When publisher Outright Games first came with the idea of the game to the developer, it was decided that the game would revolve around Scrat mainly due to the comedy of the character, with Just Add Water's CEO Stewart Gilray saying an interview claiming humour was "strangely" one of the most important factors in the game's development. The game was announced on 28 June 2019.

Reception

The Nintendo Switch version received "generally unfavorable reviews" and the PlayStation 4 version "mixed or average reviews" according to review aggregator Metacritic. In a review for ScreenRant Robin Burks called the game "a poor imitation of Crash Bandicoot that was phoned in by the movie studio" and said that the game was "almost too simple, and provides minimal challenge, regardless of the age group." Ollie Reynolds of Nintendo Life was categorical when he simply stated "this isn’t a good game", adding it was an "incredibly mundane platformer that’s completely devoid of any originality or challenge." James Birks of The Xbox Hub however was more complementary, calling levels "well-designed in regards the layouts, feature collectibles to search out" and thought that they "generally [didn't] outstay their welcome length-wise."

References

External links

2019 video games
Outright Games games
Ice Age (franchise) games
Nintendo Switch games
PlayStation 4 games
Stadia games
Video games developed in the United Kingdom
Xbox One games
Windows games
Video games based on films
Video games set in prehistory
Blue Sky Studios video games